"Beloved" is a song by Australian recording artist Wendy Matthews. It was released in February 1998 as the third and final single from her fourth studio album, Ghosts. The song peaked at number 49 on the Australian charts in September 1998.

Track listing
 "Beloved" - 4:15
 "I Lied" - 2:24
 "Ruins (Jesu, Joy of Man's Desire)" - 4:25

Charts

References

1998 singles
1997 songs
Wendy Matthews songs